Crook is a village and civil parish in the South Lakeland district of the English county of Cumbria, located on the B5284 road between Kendal and Windermere. In the 2001 census the parish had a population of 340, increasing at the 2011 census to 364.

St. Catherine's church was built in the 1880s by Stephen Shaw, a local architect, in a plain late Perpendicular style. The tower of an earlier church, built about 1620, still stands nearby: the rest of the building was demolished in 1887 owing to structural defects.

A mile to the north of the village, Hollin Hall is a Grade II listed building.

See also

Listed buildings in Crook, Cumbria

References

External links

 Crook and Winster Parish Council
 Visit Cumbria
 Cumbria County History Trust: Crook (nb: provisional research only – see Talk page)

Villages in Cumbria
Civil parishes in Cumbria
South Lakeland District